Coldstream Stone is a small polychrome, painted stone that was found buried with a human skeleton in a rock shelter near the Lottering River in the southern coast of the Western Cape Province in South Africa.

The painting consists of three figures in red, black and white. The central figure appears to be carrying a bow and hunting arrows in his shoulder, whilst carrying a feather and palette in hands. The main rock artists of South Africa were the San hunter-gatherers, and the figures on this burial stone may very well be San medicine men performing a trance to  enter the supernatural world. The stone is well preserved and it is unusual for its variety of colors. Three figures with white faces and vibrantly elongated ochre bodies stride across this round stone's surface Southern African rock paintings and engravings often combine geometric forms with images of humans and animals.

References

Rock art